Rukebai Inabo (b. 1958) is a Palauan politician, who has been a member of the Senate of Palau since 2016. Prior to entering politics, Inabo was a businesswoman who worked at the Office of the Public Auditor, the Philippine Prudential Life Insurance Company, the Bank of Hawaii and was CEO at the Palau Public Utilities Corporation. She joined the Senate of Palau at the 2016 Palauan general election.

References

Living people
21st-century Palauan women politicians
21st-century Palauan politicians
Members of the Senate of Palau
1958 births